The 1910–11 Tennessee Volunteers basketball team represents the University of Tennessee during the 1910–11 college men's basketball season. The head coach was Lex Stone, coaching the team his first season. The Volunteers team captain was Earl F. Ketchen.

Schedule

|-

References

Tennessee Volunteers basketball seasons
Tennessee
Tennessee Volunteers
Tennessee Volunteers